Steve Dillard may refer to:

Steve Dillard (baseball) (born 1951), American baseball player
Stephen Dillard (born 1969), American judge and political activist